Antonio Campos (born March 8, 1973) is an American musician. He is the current bassist for industrial metal bands Static-X and Fear Factory and the vocalist and bassist for extreme metal band Asesino. He is also a former bassist for Prong, Soulfly, Ministry and Possessed. Campos is the only member of Static-X to appear on every studio album.

Career 
Campos was part of the original Static-X lineup, playing bass and performing backing vocals on all of the group's studio albums. Along with Wayne Static, he was one of the legal owners of the Static-X name, even though he did not participate in the band's temporary reunion from 2012–2013.

In 2001, Campos broke his collarbone in a motorcycle accident, leaving him unable to play in the ongoing "Extreme Steel Tour". Campos continued to sing backing vocals on the tour, and Marty O'Brien took over bass duties.

In 2002, Campos became part of Mexican American metal group Asesino. His stage name, "Maldito X", is Spanish for "Damned X". In the same year, he played bass with the Colombian band Agony during the Rock al Parque.

Campos has played bass for Ministry in four stints (2007–2008, 2011–2012, 2014–2016, 2017–2019), following the death of Paul Raven. He has joined Ministry again for their US tour with Death Grips in Autumn 2017.

From 2011–2012, he was a member of death metal band Possessed. He also played with Possessed in 2013 at The Oakland Metro.

He also joined Soulfly in 2011 as their bassist.

In May 2015, Campos announced his departure from Soulfly, and that he would be joining Fear Factory as their bassist.

In October 2018, Campos announced that he and the other two surviving original members – guitarist Koichi Fukuda and drummer Ken Jay – had reformed Static-X, who were planning to release a new album and tour in 2019 in memory of Wayne Static.

Band history

Influences 
Campos has cited Blasko, Cliff Burton, Dan Lilker, Jeff Hanneman, and Kerry King as influences.

Equipment 
 Zon Legacy 5-string with EMG MM5CS pickups
 Neal Moser Custom Shop Scimitar (P-bass style) 4-string with EMG-P pickup, tuned BbFBbEb
Fernandes Tremor 5-strings with EMG-40DC pickups, tuned BbFBbEbAb.
 SWR SM-900 head, SWR Goliath Senior 6x10 cab.
Tech 21 SansAmp PSA-1 preamp, Dunlop 105Q Bass Wah, Line 6 Bass POD
Fernandes five-string signature Tremor bass guitars with EMG-40HZ and MM5CS pickups.

Campos tunes to ADGCF when playing in Asesino. With Static-X, he played with several tunings: CFBbEbG and BbFBbEbAb during Shadow Zone and forward.

Personal life 
Campos majored in computer science before becoming a musician. He's an avid video gamer and considers the Doom and Halo series as his all-time favorites.

Discography

Static-X 

Wisconsin Death Trip (1999)
Machine (2001)
Shadow Zone (2003)
Start a War (2005)
Cannibal (2007)
Cult of Static (2009)
Project: Regeneration Vol. 1 (2020)

Asesino 
 Corridos de Muerte (2002)
 Cristo Satánico (2006)

Buck Satan and the 666 Shooters 
 Bikers Welcome Ladies Drink Free (2011)

Ministry 
 Relapse (2012)
 From Beer to Eternity (2013)
 AmeriKKKant (2018)

Soulfly 
 Enslaved (2012)
 Savages (2013)
 Archangel (2015)

Prong 
 Carved into Stone (2012)

Attika 7 
 Blood of My Enemies (2012)

As guest member

References

External links

Living people
American heavy metal bass guitarists
American male bass guitarists
American heavy metal singers
American industrial musicians
1973 births
Alternative metal bass guitarists
American musicians of Mexican descent
Hispanic and Latino American musicians
Asesino members
Cavalera Conspiracy members
Fear Factory members
Ministry (band) members
Prong (band) members
Soulfly members
Possessed (band) members
Static-X members
21st-century American bass guitarists
21st-century American male singers
21st-century American singers
Industrial metal musicians